The Blephariceridae, commonly known as net-winged midges, are a nematoceran family in the order Diptera. The adults resemble crane flies except with a projecting anal angle in the wings, and different head shape, absence of the V on the mesonotum, and more laterally outstretched, forward-facing legs. They are uncommon, but dozens of genera occur worldwide, and over 200 species.

They are found near fast-flowing streams where the larvae live. Blepharicerid larvae are filter feeders and have suckers on their abdominal sternites, used to adhere to rocks in the torrents in which they live. These suckers are sometimes called creeping welts. These are of unique evolutionary origin within the Diptera.

One recent classification based largely on fossils treats this family as the sole member of its infraorder, but this has not gained wide acceptance.

Selected Genera and Species

Subfamily Blepharicerinae
Tribe Blepharicerini
Agathon Rodor, 1890
Agathon arizonica (Alexander, 1958)
Agathon aylmeri (Garrett, 1923)
Agathon comstocki (Kellogg, 1903)
Agathon dismalea (Hogue, 1970)
Agathon doanei (Kellogg, 1900)
Agathon elegantulus Roder, 1890
Agathon markii (Garrett, 1925)
Agathon sequoiarum (Alexander, 1952)
Bibiocephala
Bibiocephala grandis Osten Sacken, 1874
Blepharicera Macquart, 1843
Blepharicera appalachiae Hogue and Georgian, 1986
Blepharicera capitata (Loew, 1863)
Blepharicera cherokea Hogue, 1978
Blepharicera coweetae Hogue and Georgian, 1985
Blepharicera diminutiva Hogue, 1978
Blepharicera jordani (Kellogg, 1903)
Blepharicera micheneri (Alexander, 1959)
Blepharicera ostensackeni Kellogg, 1903
Blepharicera similans (Johannsen, 1929)
Blepharicera tenuipes (Walker, 1848)
Blepharicera williamsae (Alexander, 1953)
Blepharicera zionensis (Alexander, 1953)
Philorus
Philorus californicus Hogue, 1966
Philorus jacinto Hogue, 1966
Philorus vanduzeei Alexander, 1963
Philorus yosemite (Osten Sacken, 1877)
Subfamily Edwardsininae
Edwardsina
Edwardsina gigantea Zwick, 1977
Edwardsina tasmaniensis Tonnoir, 1924
Paulianina

Extinct genera 

 †Blephadejura Lukashevich et al. 2006 Daohugou, China, Callovian
 †Brianina Zhang and Lukashevich 2007 Daohugou, China, Callovian
 †Megathon Lukashevich and Shcherbakov 1997 Daohugou, China, Callovian, Ola Formation, Russia, Campanian
 †Philorites Cockerell 1908 Green River Formation, Colorado, Eocene
 †Sinotendipes Hong and Wang 1990 Laiyang Formation, China, Aptian

References

Loew H. 1862. Monographs of the Diptera of North America. Part 1. Smithsonian Institution, Smithsonian Miscellaneous Collection 6(1): 1–221, fig. 1-3+1-12, 2 pls.

External links 

 Tree of Life Blephariceromorpha
 Iowa State University Biology, Classification, Keys (introductory figure).
 Video of a Blepharicerid larva

 
Nematocera families
Taxa named by Hermann Loew